Pseudosasa japonica, the arrow bamboo or metake,  is a species of flowering plant in the grass family Poaceae, native to Japan and Korea. The culms are typically yellow-brown and it has palm-like leaves. The common name "arrow bamboo" results from the Japanese Samurai using its hard and stiff canes for their arrows. It grows up to  a day.

Cultivation
This cold hardy bamboo species (tolerant to 0 °F/−17.7 °C) grows well both in shade and full sun. Pseudosasa japonica does very well in containers and salty air near the ocean.  Because it tends to be more shade tolerant than other bamboo species it is often used by gardeners as an understory to a tree-lined living fence. In cultivation in the UK this species has gained the Royal Horticultural Society's Award of Garden Merit.

Subspecies
Pseudosasa japonica var. japonica
Pseudosasa japonica var. tsutsumiana

References

Further reading

Bambusoideae
Flora of Japan
Flora of Korea
Grasses of Asia